Mapo-gu Office Station is a Seoul Metropolitan Subway station near the Mapo district office in Seoul, opened in December 2000.

Station layout

Exits
 Exit 1 : Seoul Traffic & Safe public corporation, Sinbuk elementary school, Sungsan 2dong town office, Ways to Gyeryong, Daerim, Sungsan Siyoung, Sewon, Iaan apartment complex, Southern part of Seoul World Cup
 Exit 2 : Sungsan 2 dong, Benz-Hanseong vehicles (service center), several apartment complex.
 Exit 3 : Mapo gu office, Seongsu middle school, Seongsan 1dong office
 Exit 5 : Hapjeong-no, Worldcup market
 Exit 6 : Mangwon 2 police center, Mangwon elementary school
 Exit 7 : Seongsanno, Civil park of Han River

References 

Metro stations in Mapo District
Seoul Metropolitan Subway stations
Railway stations opened in 2000